ECWA Legacy Championship is the secondary championship contested in the independent professional wrestling promotion, East Coast Wrestling Association.The current champion is Sam Shields, who is in his first reign.

Title history

Combined reigns

References

Duncan, Royal and Gary Will. Wrestling Title Histories, Revised 4th Edition. Waterloo, Ontario: Archeus Communications, 2000.

External links
 Official title history at East Coast Wrestling Association
 	ECWA Legacy Championship

East Coast Wrestling Association championships
Regional professional wrestling championships